Anna Kalinskaya and Viktória Kužmová won the title, defeating defending champions Nicole Melichar and Květa Peschke in the final, 4–6, 7–5, [10–7].

Seeds

Draw

Draw

References

External Links
 Main draw

Doubles